The Platino Honorary Award (Spanish: Premio Platino de Honor del Cine Iberoamericano) is an honorary award given annually at the Platino Awards. The award is presented to recognize recognize the professional career of a person linked to the field of film, arts and Ibero-American culture.

Recipients

References

External links 
 

Honorary
Platino
Lifetime achievement awards